Austroperipatus is a genus of oviparous and ovoviviparous velvet worms in the family Peripatopsidae. This genus has 15 pairs of legs in both sexes. The species in this genus are found in northern Queensland, Australia.

Species 
The genus contains the following species:

 Austroperipatus aequabilis Reid, 1996
 Austroperipatus eridelos Reid, 1996
 Austroperipatus paradoxus (Bouvier, 1915)
 Austroperipatus superbus Reid, 1996

References 

Onychophorans of Australasia
Onychophoran genera